Ə, or ə, also called schwa, is an additional letter of the Latin alphabet. In the International Phonetic Alphabet (IPA), minuscule ə is used to represent the mid central vowel or a schwa.

It was invented by Johann Andreas Schmeller for the reduced vowel at the end of some German words and first used in his 1820s works on the Bavarian dialects.

It is or was used in several languages around the world, including the Azerbaijani, Gottscheerish, Karay·a and Adyghe languages, and Abenaki language of Quebec, and in the hən̓q̓əmin̓əm̓ dialect of Halkomelem. Both the majuscule and minuscule forms of this letter are based on the form of a turned e, while the Pan-Nigerian alphabet pairs the same lowercase letter with Ǝ.

A superscript minuscule ᵊ is used to modify the preceding consonant to have a mid central vowel release, though it is also commonly used to indicate possible syllabicity of the following sonorant, especially in transcriptions of English. The latter usage is non-standard.

In the Azerbaijani alphabet, Ə represents the near-open front unrounded vowel, . The letter was used in the 1992 Chechen Latin alphabet proposal where it represented the glottal stop, . It was also used in the Uniform Turkic Alphabet, for example in Janalif for the Tatar language in the 1920s–1930s. Also, in a romanization of Pashto, the letter Ə is used to represent . When some Roman orthographies in the Soviet Union were converted to use the Cyrillic script in the 1930s and 1940s,  this letter has been adopted verbatim.

In the Karay·a alphabet, the letter represents .

In the Latin transliteration of Avestan, the corresponding long vowel is written as schwa-macron, Ə̄ ə̄.

An R-colored vowel can be represented using ɚ.

A schwa with a retroflex hook (ᶕ) is used in phonetic transcription.

Use for gender neutrality in Italian

The schwa has recently also seen increased use in the Italian language, replacing the gendered suffixes of the language, in order to keep words gender neutral. For example, the use of the schwa in the word “tuttə” (all/everyone), as opposed to “tutti” (all/everyone, masculine plural). This usage is controversial, with president of the Accademia della Crusca opposing its use.

Unicode encodings

Since the legacy fixed 8-bit ISO/IEC Turkish encoding contains neither Ə nor ə, Ä ä has sometimes been used for the Azerbaijani language instead, as in the Tatar and Turkmen languages.

In Windows, the characters can be generated by holding the  key and pressing the respective decimal Unicode number, which can be found in the table (e.g. 399, 601), on the number pad preceded by a leading . 

References

Latin-script letters
Phonetic transcription symbols
Azerbaijani language